Dhamiak is a village of Jhelum District in the Punjab province of Pakistan. It is also the death place of Mohammad of Ghour.

References

Populated places in Rawalpindi District